Kevin Vereen is a United States Army lieutenant general who serves as the deputy chief of staff for installations of the U.S. Army. He previously served as commanding general of the United States Army Recruiting Command from July 23, 2020, to September 21, 2022. As the army's chief recruiter, Vereen was the principal military advisor to the Commanding General, United States Army Training and Doctrine Command on all matters pertaining to the scouting, recruiting, medical and psychological examination, induction and processing of potential service personnel. He previously served as the United States Army Provost Marshal General from 2019 to 2020 and deputy commanding general (operations) of the Army Recruiting Command from 2017 to 2019.

Military career
In May 2022, Vereen was nominated for promotion to lieutenant general and assignment as the deputy chief of staff for installations of the United States Army.

References

External links
 

21st-century African-American people
African-American United States Army personnel
Campbell University alumni
Living people
Recipients of the Distinguished Service Medal (US Army)
Recipients of the Legion of Merit
United States Army Command and General Staff College alumni
United States Army generals
United States Army personnel of the Iraq War
United States Army Provost Marshal Generals
Year of birth missing (living people)